Siamo tutti inquilini is a 1953 Italian comedy film directed by Mario Mattoli and starring Aldo Fabrizi.

Plot
Anna has been since childhood the housemaid of an old lady, and has inherited from her a beautiful apartment. She now works in a cafe`, but struggles to keep up with the expenses of the luxurious housing complex. She is alone in the world and apart from her loving fiance Carlo, only the wise caretaker of the building Augusto shows her some fatherly affection.

The greedy and tyrannical administrator of the building, the dentist Talloni, would like to exploit the financial difficulties of Anna to buy her out, offering through a figurehead to acquire the apartment much below its real value. Augusto and the lawyer Sassi figure out the scheme, and decide to defend Anna's interests. They first manage to delay for few days the official decision to force repayment of her debts, they try to secure her a loan through the bank or through the richer acquaintance of a well-off neighbor, they come up with the idea for Anna to rent out the apartment to an older couple while remaining in service and caretaker of the property as housemaid.

None of this represents a complete solution for the young girl's problems, and everybody must manage at the same time some other difficulties - Sassi is afraid of irritating his jealous wife in case of excessive involvement, Augusto must defend his job from both Talloni's intention to fire him and from a poorer friend who would like to take over his job as a caretaker, the other tenants seem generally well-disposed but they are also very self-centered.
Thanks to Augusto selfless efforts and even his cheating to gather all neighbors at the crucial meeting where the course of action for Anna's debt should be decided, the administrator's plans are eventually exposed and a compromise arrangement is reached.

Cast
 Aldo Fabrizi as Augusto, the caretaker
 Anna Maria Ferrero as Anna Perrini, heiress of a luxurious apartment where she had been serving as housemaid
 Enrico Viarisio as the lawyer Sassi
 Tania Weber as Lulù
 Nino Pavese as the denstist Talloni, administrator of the housing complex
 Maria-Pia Casilio as Una cameriera
 Alberto Talegalli as Il venditore di uova
 Giuseppe Porelli
 Bice Valori as Una cameriera
 Maurizio Arena as Carlo, boyfriend of Anna
 Gemma Bolognesi
 Turi Pandolfini
 Peppino De Filippo as Antonio Scognamiglio, idler friend of Augusto who would like to take his place as caretaker

External links

1953 films
1953 comedy films
1950s Italian-language films
Italian black-and-white films
Films set in Rome
Films directed by Mario Mattoli
Films with screenplays by Ruggero Maccari
Italian comedy films
1950s Italian films